Gérard Davet (born 1966) is a French investigative journalist for Le Monde.

Early life
Gérard Davet was born on August 25, 1966. His father is a salesman and his mother is a teacher. He grew up in Meudon-la-Forêt.

Career
Davet became a journalist for Le Parisien in 1989. He has been an investigative journalist for Le Monde since 2011. In October 2010, as he was reporting on the Bettencourt affair, his apartment was broken in, with only a laptop and GPS device stolen from the premises. In March 2014, he received a threatening letter linked to some investigative work he was doing.

Davet is the co-author of several books with Fabrice Lhomme. Two books, Sarko m'a tuer and Sarko s'est tuer, are about President Nicolas Sarkozy. Another book, L'homme qui voulut être roi, is about Gaston Flosse. Two more books, French corruption and La clef : révélations sur la fraude fiscale du siècle, are about allegations of political corruptions and tax evasion in France. Their sixth book, "Un président ne devrait pas dire ça...", is based on interviews with President François Hollande.

Works

References

1966 births
Living people
French investigative journalists
People from Courbevoie
French male journalists